Susan Cachel is an American anthropologist, paleontologist, and researcher who specializes in primate evolution. In 2009, she was named a Fellow of the American Association for the Advancement of Science for her work in the field of primate evolution.

Education 
Cachel has a B.A. (1970), M.A. (1971), and a Ph.D. (1976) from the University of Chicago. Her Ph.D. thesis advisor was R.H. Tuttle. She has been at Rutgers University since 1977.

Selected publications

References

External links
 Rutgers faculty page
 Primate and Human Evolution,  Cambridge University Press

Year of birth missing (living people)
Living people
American anthropologists
American paleontologists
Women paleontologists
Fellows of the American Association for the Advancement of Science
Rutgers University faculty
University of Chicago alumni